N'Douci (also spelled Ndouci) is a town in southern Ivory Coast. It is a sub-prefecture of Tiassalé Department in Agnéby-Tiassa Region, Lagunes District. N'Douci was a commune until March 2012, when it became one of 1126 communes nationwide that were abolished. In 2021, the population of the sub-prefecture of N'Douci was 97,194.

Villages
The 12 villages of the sub-prefecture of N'Douci and their population in 2014 are:

Notes

Sub-prefectures of Agnéby-Tiassa
Former communes of Ivory Coast